Corfe Castle is an ancient castle in Dorset, England.

It has given its name to:

Corfe Castle (village), a nearby village
Corfe Castle (UK Parliament constituency)
Corfe Castle Hundred, a hundred containing the parish
Corfe Castle railway station, located in the village

See also
 Corfe, a village in Somerset
 Corfe Mullen, a village in Dorset